A public procurator is an officer of a state charged with both the investigation and prosecution of crime.  The office is a feature of a civil law inquisitorial rather than common law adversarial system. Countries such as Japan, China, Russia and Indonesia adopt the procuratorial system.

The office of a procurator is called a procuracy or procuratorate. The terms are from Latin and originate with the procurators of the Roman Empire.

References

External links 
 Chinese Laws and Regulations.People's Daily Online. english.peopledaily.com.cn. Retrieved December 1, 2020.
 http://en.chinacourt.org/public/detail.php?id=110

Legal professions
Prosecutors
Procurator